Mark Garner (born 30 June 1969, in New South Wales) is a retired sprinter from Australia, who represented his native country at two consecutive Summer Olympics, starting in 1988 (Seoul, South Korea). His best result was winning the silver medal in the men's 4 × 400 m relay at the 1988 World Junior Championships.

Achievements

1Representing Oceania

References
 Profile

1969 births
Living people
Australian male sprinters
Athletes (track and field) at the 1988 Summer Olympics
Athletes (track and field) at the 1992 Summer Olympics
Olympic athletes of Australia
People from New South Wales
Athletes (track and field) at the 1990 Commonwealth Games
Commonwealth Games competitors for Australia